Tethysuchia is an extinct clade of neosuchian mesoeucrocodylian crocodylomorphs from the late Middle Jurassic (Bathonian stage) to the Early Eocene (Ypresian stage) of Asia, Europe, North America and South America. It was named by the French paleontologist Eric Buffetaut in 1982 as a suborder. Tethysuchia was considered to be a synonym of Dyrosauridae or Pholidosauridae for many years. In most phylogenetic analyses the node Dyrosauridae+Pholidosauridae was strongly supported. De Andrade et al. (2011) suggested that Tethysuchia be resurrected for that node. They defined it as a node-based taxon "composed of Pholidosaurus purbeckensis (Mansel-Pleydell, 1888) and Dyrosaurus phosphaticus (Thomas, 1893), their common ancestor and all its descendants". In their analysis they found that the support for Tethysuchia is actually stronger than the support for Thalattosuchia. The following cladogram shows the position of Tethysuchia among the Neosuchia sensu this study.

References

Cretaceous crocodylomorphs
Jurassic crocodylomorphs
Paleocene crocodylomorphs
Bathonian first appearances
Ypresian extinctions
Eocene crocodylomorphs
Taxa named by Éric Buffetaut